The following radio stations broadcast on FM frequency 101.9 MHz:

Argentina
 de La Costa in Granadero Baigorria, Santa Fe
 LRI405 Activa in Arteaga, Santa Fe
 LRM955 Maria Juana in María Juana, Santa Fe
 Radio María in Olavarría, Buenos Aires
 Radio María in Villa del Soto, Córdoba
 Radio María in Ceres, Santa Fe
 Radio Positiva in Rosario, Santa Fe

Australia
 4MMK in Mackay, Queensland
 2NWR in Armidale, New South Wales
 3FOX in Melbourne, Victoria
 2WLF in Wagga Wagga, New South Wales
 ABC Radio National in Roxby Downs, South Australia
 4CEE in Maryborough, Queensland
 Snow FM in Perisher Ski Resort, New South Wales
 Triple J in Orange, New South Wales
 Triple J in Renmark, South Australia
 Triple J in Strahan, Tasmania

Canada (Channel 270)

 CBAL-FM-1 in Neguac-Allardville, New Brunswick
 CBAX-FM-2 in St. John's, Newfoundland and Labrador
 CBJ-FM-4 in L'Anse-St-Jean, Quebec
 CBMG-FM in Cowansville, Quebec
 CBPL-FM in Kamloops, British Columbia
 CFDA-FM in Victoriaville, Quebec
 CFFB-1-FM in Cambridge Bay, Nunavut
 CFFB-2-FM in Kugluktuk, Nunavut
 CFLO-FM-1 in L'Annonciation, Quebec
 CFND-FM in St-Jerome, Quebec
 CFRC-FM in Kingston, Ontario
 CFUV-FM in Victoria, British Columbia
 CHAI-FM in Chateauguay, Quebec
 CHAI-FM-1 in Candiac, Quebec
 CHFP-FM in Fort Providence, Northwest Territories
 CHFS-FM in Fort Smith, Northwest Territories
 CHFX-FM in Halifax, Nova Scotia
 CHIP-FM in Fort-Coulonge, Quebec
 CHRK-FM in Sydney, Nova Scotia
 CHRR-FM in Hay River Reserve, Northwest Territories
 CITR-FM in Vancouver, British Columbia
 CJFW-FM-2 in Prince Rupert, British Columbia
 CJFW-FM-8 in Hazelton, British Columbia
 CJSS-FM in Cornwall, Ontario
 CKFX-FM in North Bay, Ontario
 CKKC-1-FM in Crawford Bay, British Columbia
 CKKY-FM in Wainwright, Alberta
 CKLB-FM in Yellowknife, Northwest Territories
 VF2008 in Arctic Red River, Northwest Territories
 VF2020 in Kakisa, Northwest Territories
 VF2022 in Fort Liard, Northwest Territories
 VF2025 in Wrigley, Northwest Territories
 VF2026 in Snowdrift, Northwest Territories
 VF2054 in Lac La Martre, Northwest Territories
 VF2069 in Fort Franklin, Northwest Territories
 VF2070 in Fort Good Hope, Northwest Territories
 VF2071 in Fort Rae, Northwest Territories
 VF2080 in Fort McPherson, Northwest Territories
 VF2081 in Fort Resolution, Northwest Territories
 VF2082 in Inuvik, Northwest Territories
 VF2083 in Aklavik, Northwest Territories
 VF2101 in Fort St. James, British Columbia
 VF2102 in Fort Simpson, Northwest Territories
 VF2387 in St-Ludger-de-Milot, Quebec
 VOAR-11-FM in Goose Bay, Newfoundland and Labrador

China 
 CNR China Traffic Radio in Yinchuan
 CRI News Radio in Chizhou (stopped airing on 15 January 2021)

Malaysia
 Johor FM in Johor Bahru, Johor and Singapore
 Nasional FM in Kota Bharu, Kelantan
 Raaga in Langkawi, Kedah

Mexico
 XEAD-FM in Guadalajara, Jalisco
 XHCAM-FM in Campeche, Campeche
 XHCBJ-FM in Cancún, Quintana Roo
 XHENU-FM in Nuevo Laredo, Tamaulipas
 XHEOF-FM in Celaya (El Puesto), Guanajuato
 XHHOS-FM in Hermosillo (La Paloma), Sonora
 XHPF-FM in Mexicali, Baja California
 XHPNA-FM in Tepic, Nayarit
 XHRIC-FM in Poza Rica, Veracruz
 XHUMI-FM in Torreón, Coahuila
 XHUQ-FM in Zihuatanejo, Guerrero

Philippines (Channel 270)
 DWRR-FM in Quezon City, Metro Manila (inactive due to franchise non-renewal of ABS-CBN)
 DYFM in Cebu City
 DXFM in Davao City
 DWKP in Legaspi

Turkey
 TRT-4 at Gaziantep
 Radyo Mavi at Gebze, Istanbul, Bursa, Kocaeli, Sakarya, Tekirdağ, Çanakkale, Balıkesir and Edirne

United Kingdom
 Classic FM in Belfast, Northern Ireland

United States (Channel 270)

 KACQ in Lometa, Texas
 KATP in Amarillo, Texas
  in Bottineau, North Dakota
 KBUS in Paris, Texas
 KBXT in Franklin, Texas
  in Ashland, Oregon
 KCSC-LP in Mukilteo, Washington
 KELO-FM in Sioux Falls, South Dakota
 KFGG-LP in Marble Falls, Texas
  in Belle Fourche, South Dakota
 KHHM in Shingle Springs, California
 KHTB in Ogden, Utah
  in Burns, Wyoming
  in Portland, Oregon
 KJDS in Mountain Pine, Arkansas
 KJFK-LP in Hot Springs, Montana
 KJVV in Twentynine Palms, California
  in Hill City, Kansas
  in Fresno, California
 KLWR in North Rock Springs, Wyoming
 KMVX in Monroe, Louisiana
  in Lowell, Arkansas
 KNHK-FM in Weston, Oregon
  in Waterloo, Iowa
  in La Vista, Nebraska
 KPBM-LP in Poplar Bluff, Missouri
 KPCR-LP in Santa Cruz, California
  in Emmett, Idaho
 KQES-LP in Bellevue, Washington
  in Walker, Minnesota
  in Miami, Arizona
  in San Antonio, Texas
  in Laurel, Montana
  in Fargo, North Dakota
  in Glendale, California
 KSML-FM in Huntington, Texas
 KSMZ-LP in Missoula, Montana
 KSUG in Heber Springs, Arkansas
 KTAH-LP in Tacoma, Washington
  in Taos, New Mexico
  in Agana, Guam
 KTSL in Medical Lake, Washington
  in Oklahoma City, Oklahoma
 KUCD in Pearl City, Hawaii
 KVJH-LP in Topeka, Kansas
 KVSH-LP in Vashon, Washington
  in San Angelo, Texas
  in Las Vegas, Nevada
 KWNW in Crawfordsville, Arkansas
 KXWA in Centennial, Colorado
 KXZI-LP in Kalispell, Montana
 KYAD-LP in Bakersfield, California
  in Eldon, Missouri
 KZZQ (FM) in Richardton, North Dakota
  in Roann, Indiana
 WATB-LP in Atlanta, Georgia
  in Pottsville, Pennsylvania
  in Cleveland, Georgia
  in Gastonia, North Carolina
  in Bainbridge, Georgia
  in Falmouth, Massachusetts
  in Alfred, New York
  in Detroit, Michigan
  in Wausau, Wisconsin
 WDXD-LP in Tallahassee, Florida
 WEKV in Central City, Kentucky
 WFAN-FM in New York, New York
  in Fulton, Mississippi
  in Montgomery, Alabama
  in Ruckersville, Virginia
  in Jamestown, New York
  in New Bern, North Carolina
  in Tennille, Georgia
  in Cherry Valley, New York
 WJVR in Iron Gate, Virginia
  in North Corbin, Kentucky
  in Westminster, Vermont
  in Brownsburg, Indiana
  in Negaunee, Michigan
 WKRP-LP in Raleigh, North Carolina
  in Cincinnati, Ohio
  in South Hill, Virginia
  in Traverse City, Michigan
 WLFZ in Springfield, Illinois
  in Baltimore, Maryland
 WLMG in New Orleans, Louisiana
 WOCE in Ringgold, Georgia
 WOCT-LP in Oshkosh, Wisconsin
 WOIB-LP in Oakland Park, Florida
 WOMP-LP in Cambridge, Ohio
 WOZI in Presque Isle, Maine
 WPHX-LP in Ruskin, Florida
  in Pearson, Georgia
  in Portland, Maine
 WQJJ-LP in Jasper, Alabama
 WQMP in Daytona Beach, Florida
 WRFP-LP in Eau Claire, Wisconsin
 WSDX-LP in Brandon, Florida
  in Skokie, Illinois
  in Morgantown, West Virginia
 WVLQ in Port St. Joe, Florida
  in Logan, West Virginia
  in Fort Myers, Florida
 WYLR in Hubbard, Ohio
  in Ponce, Puerto Rico

References

Lists of radio stations by frequency